Bošilec is a municipality and village in České Budějovice District in the South Bohemian Region of the Czech Republic. It has about 200 inhabitants.

History
The first written mention of Bošilec is from 1318.

Gallery

References

Villages in České Budějovice District